Blumea tenella is a flowering plant in the family Asteraceae found in northern Australia from Queensland through the Northern Territory to Western Australia. It is also found in Indonesia, Borneo, New Guinea and New Caledonia.

Blumella tenella is an aromatic herb with yellow flowers, growing from 3 to 40 cm high. It is found on rocky or loam soils and on cracking clay on river flood plains, near creeks and swamps. 

Blumea tenella was first described in 1834 by Augustin Pyramus de Candolle.

The Walmajarri people of the southern Kimberley call this plant Ngurnungurna.

References

External links
ALA: Blumea tenella: occurrence data

Inuleae
Plants described in 1834
Taxa named by Augustin Pyramus de Candolle